Narendra Rao (born 27 June 1995) is a Fijian footballer who plays as a midfielder for Ba in the Fiji National Football League.

Career
Rao started playing football when he was in secondary school. He joined Ba when he was 14 years old and he made his debut in 2012 when he was 16 years old.

International career
Rao made his debut in the Fiji jersey at the 2011 OFC U-17 Championship. This tournament was unsuccessful for Fiji as they managed to win only one time, a 9–0 victory against American Samoa. Rao managed to score two goals himself. After the U17's Rao went on to play with U20's, something that turned out to be a little bit more successful. In 2013 they only managed a second spot, however at the 2014 OFC U-20 Championship they reached the first place. This meant that they had qualified for the 2015 FIFA U-20 World Cup. It was the first time that Fiji had qualified for a FIFA event. Rao played all games at the U20 World Cup, including in Fiji's historical 3–0 victory against Honduras. In August 2017 he was called up for the Fijian national football team for two friendly matches in Indonesia. He made his debut on September 2, 2017 in a 0-0 draw against the Indonesia national football team.

References

External links

Living people
1995 births
Association football midfielders
Fiji international footballers
Fijian footballers
Ba F.C. players
Fijian people of Indian descent